Andrew Snape (1675–1742) was an English cleric, academic and headmaster, provost of King's College, Cambridge from 1719.

Life
He was born at Hampton Court, Middlesex, the son of Andrew Snape (the younger), serjeant farrier to Charles II, and author of The Anatomy of an Horse (1683). The son was admitted to Eton College in 1683, and was elected to a scholarship at King's College, Cambridge, in 1689. He graduated B.A. in 1693, M.A. in 1697, and was created D.D. comitiis regiis in 1705.

Snape became lecturer of St. Martin's, London, and was chaplain to Charles Seymour, 6th Duke of Somerset, chancellor of the university of Cambridge, by whom he was presented in 1706 to the rectory of the united parishes of St Mary-at-Hill and St. Andrew Hubbard. In 1707 he was deputed by his university to represent, on its behalf, the faculty of theology at the jubilee of the foundation of the university of Frankfurt-on-the-Oder; and during his stay on the continent he preached a sermon before the Electress Sophia. He became one of the chaplains in ordinary to Queen Anne, and held the same office under George I.

In 1711 Snape was appointed headmaster of Eton, which flourished under his management. The part which he took in the Bangorian controversy gave offence at court, and his name, like that of Thomas Sherlock, was removed from the list of king's chaplains. On the death of John Adams he was chosen provost of King's College, Cambridge, in February 1719. He was vice-chancellor of the university in 1723–4. Early in 1737 he became rector of Knebworth, Hertfordshire, but resigned the living in August of the same year, when he was presented by the chapter of Windsor to the rectory of West Ildesley, Berkshire.

Snape died in his lodgings in Windsor Castle on 30 December 1742. He was buried in the south aisle of St. George's Chapel.

Works
Snape was one of the principals in the Bangorian controversy, and in numerous pamphlets he attacked the principles upheld by Benjamin Hoadly. The first of his Letters to the Bishop of Bangor passed through seventeen editions in the year of its publication, 1717.

The sermons which he published separately were, with additions, printed as Forty-five Sermons on several Subjects, 3 vols. London, 1745, under the editorship of John Chapman, D.D., and William Berriman, D.D. In two Spital sermons preached in 1707 and 1718 he advocate humane treatment of the mentally ill. He contributed verses to the university collections on the death of Queen Mary, the Peace of Ryswick, and the accession of Queen Anne. Snape was the editor of  Robert Moss's Sermons (1732); but the preface, "by a Learned Hand", was by Zachary Grey.

Family
Snape married Rebecca, widow of Sir Joshua Sharp, sheriff of London, and daughter of John Hervey, merchant, of London.

References

Attribution

1675 births
1742 deaths
18th-century English Anglican priests
Provosts of King's College, Cambridge
Head Masters of Eton College
People educated at Eton College
Vice-Chancellors of the University of Cambridge
Alumni of King's College, Cambridge